Madeline DeFrees (also known as, Sister Mary Gilbert; November 18, 1919 – November 11, 2015) was an American poet, teacher, and Roman Catholic nun.

Biography
Born in Ontario, Oregon, Madeline DeFrees lived in Seattle, Washington. She joined the Sisters of the Holy Names of Jesus and Mary in 1936 and took the name Sister Mary Gilbert. She received her B.A. in English from Marylhurst College (now Marylhurst University) and an M.A. in Journalism from the University of Oregon. She reclaimed her baptismal name in 1967 when she went to teach at the University of Montana. While in Missoula, she requested a dispensation from her vows, which she received in 1973.

She taught at Holy Names College from 1950 to 1967, the University of Montana from 1967 to 1979, and the University of Massachusetts, Amherst from 1979 to 1985.  After her retirement in 1985, DeFrees held residencies at Bucknell University, Eastern Washington University, and Wichita State University. She continued to write and teach until she was almost 90, joining the faculty of the Pacific University low-residency MFA program in Forest Grove, Oregon, and lecturing at the low-residency MFA program of the Northwest Institute of Literary Arts (Whidbey Writers Workshop) in January 2009.

DeFrees was the author of two chapbooks, two memoirs of convent life, and eight poetry collections, including Blue Dusk (Copper Canyon Press, 2001), which won the 2002 Lenore Marshall Poetry Prize and a Washington State Book Award for Poetry. She received a Guggenheim Fellowship in Poetry and a grant from the National Endowment for the Arts. Her final collection was Spectral Waves, (Copper Canyon Press, 2006).  Spectral Waves won a 2007 Washington State Book Award for Poetry.  DeFrees died in Portland, Oregon on November 11, 2015, one week before her 96th birthday.

Bibliography

Poetry
From the Darkroom, 1964
When the Sky Lets Go, 1978
Imaginary Ancestors (chapbook), 1978
Magpie on the Gallows, 1982 (Copper Canyon Press)
The Light Station on Tillamook Rock, 1990
Imaginary Ancestors, 1990
Possible Sibyls, 1991 (Lynx House Press)
Double Dutch (chapbook), 1999
Blue Dusk: New and Selected Poems, 1951-2001, 2001 (Copper Canyon Press)
Spectral Waves, 2006 (Copper Canyon Press)
Where the Horse Takes Wing: The Uncollected Poems of Madeline DeFrees, 2019 (Two Sylvias Press)

Prose
Springs of Silence, 1953
Later Thoughts from the Springs of Silence, 1962
Subjective Geography: A Poet's Thoughts on Life and Craft, 2018 (Lynx House Press)

References

External links 
Forging a Path to Oneself interview in Real Change News
Leaving The Convent And Finding Passion Through Poetry interview on KUOW 
Madeline DeFrees Papers (University at Buffalo, Lockwood Memorial Library Archival & Manuscript Collections)
Madeline DeFrees Papers (University of Montana, Mansfield Library Archives & Special Collections)
Madeline DeFrees Papers (University of Massachusetts Amherst Libraries, Special Collections & University Archives)

1919 births
2015 deaths
Poets from Oregon
Pacific University faculty
Marylhurst University alumni
University of Oregon alumni
University of Montana faculty
University of Massachusetts Amherst faculty
Writers from Seattle
People from Ontario, Oregon
American women poets
20th-century American poets
21st-century American poets
20th-century American women writers
21st-century American women writers
Poets from Washington (state)
20th-century American Roman Catholic nuns
21st-century American Roman Catholic nuns
American women academics